Walter Van Brunt (22 April 1892 – 11 April 1971) was an American tenor known initially for his recordings on Thomas Alva Edison's Blue Amberol Records and later for his role in a scandal involving a stage name and case of adultery.

Biography
Van Brunt began his singing career at age 17 as an imitator of singer Billy Murray. He was soon performing with Ada Jones and John Bieling as well as the American Quartet. He worked in vaudeville and on Broadway, including in the musical Eileen. Van Brunt had 40 hits on pop charts, including his 1914 duet with Elizabeth Spencer.

In 1917, Van Brunt began using the name Walter J. Scanlan (newspapers sometimes erroneously rendered the name as "Scanlon"), which was the name of a late 19th-century Irish tenor who had had an established career before dying but never made any recordings. It has been suggested, but not proved, that the Irish-American composer of Eileen, Victor Herbert, had encouraged the use of this stage name when he cast Van Brunt as the leading man. It was not a secret that this was a stage name: The New York Times review of Eileen stated that Scanlan's real name was Van Brunt. Van Brunt later had a bigamous affair with a woman known as Ruth Scanlan, siring a child with her and prompting his wife Lillian to sue for divorce, which was granted in 1925 by an Irish-American judge who, in announcing his decision that Van Brunt should pay alimony, criticized Van Brunt's character.

From 1929 to 1933, Murray used Van Brunt on various radio programs. In 1929, Scanlon and Billy Murray provided the voices for the Fleischer short animation film Finding His Voice, produced by Western Electric.

References

External links
 
 Walter Van Brunt recordings at the Discography of American Historical Recordings.

1890s births
1971 deaths
American tenors
Vaudeville performers
Singers from New York City
Sex scandals
Pioneer recording artists
20th-century American male singers
20th-century American singers